Jill De Bruyn (born 13 December 1993) is a Luxembourger footballer who plays as a midfielder for Dames Ligue 1 club Munsbach and formerly the Luxembourg women's national team.

International career
De Bruyn made her senior debut for Luxembourg on 3 March 2018 during a 1–7 friendly loss to Morocco.

She announced her retirement from international football following a 6-1 friendly loss against Belgium on 28 June 2022.

References

1993 births
Living people
Women's association football midfielders
Luxembourgian women's footballers
Luxembourg women's international footballers